"Bandages" is a song by Canadian indie rock band Hot Hot Heat and is from their first album, Make Up the Breakdown. The song was released in the UK and US as the first single from Make Up the Breakdown on March 23, 2003. It reached number 25 in the UK. It was released as downloadable content for the Rock Band series on September 23, 2008.

Track listing
"Bandages (radio edit)" – 3:32
"Apt. 101" – 2:59
"Move On" – 3:33

References

2003 debut singles
Hot Hot Heat songs
2002 songs
B-Unique Records singles
Songs written by Dante DeCaro
Songs written by Steve Bays